Rock Island Arsenal is a census-designated place (CDP) in Rock Island County, Illinois, United States. The population was 149 at the 2010 census. The island contains the Rock Island National Cemetery.

Geography
Rock Island Arsenal is located at  (41.518033, -90.536959).

Demographics
As of the census of 2000, there were 145 people, 43 households, and 40 families residing in the CDP. The racial makeup of the CDP was 62.76% White, 28.28% African American, 1.38% Native American, 3.45% from other races, and 4.14% from two or more races. Hispanic or Latino of any race were 2.76% of the population.

There were 43 households, out of which 79.1% had children under the age of 18 living with them, 88.4% were married couples living together, 4.7% had a female householder with no husband present, and 4.7% were non-families. 4.7% of all households were made up of individuals, and none had someone living alone who was 65 years of age or older. The average household size was 3.37 and the average family size was 3.46.

In the CDP, the population was spread out, with 41.4% under the age of 18, 4.1% from 18 to 24, 45.5% from 25 to 44, 9.0% from 45 to 64, . The median age was 28 years. For every 100 females, there were 93.3 males. For every 100 females age 18 and over, there were 93.2 males.

The median income for a household in the CDP was $45,417, and the median income for a family was $34,375. Males had a median income of $29,063 versus $23,125 for females. The per capita income for the CDP was $15,710. None of the population and none of the families were below the poverty line.

See also
Quad Cities

References

Census-designated places in Rock Island County, Illinois
Census-designated places in Illinois
Illinois populated places on the Mississippi River